Mochlus tanae, also known commonly as Loveridge's writhing skink or the Tana River writhing skink, is a species of lizard in the family Scincidae. The species is native to East Africa.

Etymology
The specific name, tanae refers to the Tana River of Kenya.

Geographic range
M. tanae is found in Kenya, Somalia, and Tanzania.

Reproduction
M. tanae is viviparous.

References

Further reading
Lanza B (1990). "Amphibians and Reptiles of the Somali Democratic Republic: check list and biogeography". Biogeographia 14: 407–465. (Lygosoma tanae, new combination).
Loveridge A (1935). "Scientific Results of an Expedition to Rain Forest Regions in Eastern Africa. I. New Reptiles and Amphibians from East Africa". Bulletin of the Museum of Comparative Zoölogy at Harvard College 79 (1): 1–19. (Riopa tanae, new species, pp. 11–12).
Spawls, Stephen; Howell, Kim; Hinkel, Harald; Menegon, Michele (2018). Field Guide to East African Reptiles, Second Edition. London: Bloomsbury Natural History. 624 pp. . (Mochlus tanae, new combination, p. 155).

Mochlus
Skinks of Africa
Reptiles of Kenya
Reptiles of Somalia
Reptiles of Tanzania
Reptiles described in 1935
Taxa named by Arthur Loveridge